Michiel Godfried "Mike" Eman (born September 1, 1961) is an Aruban politician who served as the 3rd Prime Minister of Aruba from 2009 to 2017. His political career began in 2001, but Eman has been involved in politics in one way or another since his childhood. His grandfather, father and brother were all prominent politicians in their lifetimes, with Henny Eman having preceded him in office (twice) as Prime Minister, including as the first to hold the office after Aruba's status aparte in 1986.

Eman is a graduate of the University of the Netherlands Antilles (UNA) earning his law degree in 1992 with a thesis entitled "The Position of the Institution of the Public Prosecutor vis à vis the Minister of Justice in a Small Scale Community." In 1996 he earned a degree in Civil Notary Law from the same university.

From 1992 to 2001, Eman worked as a deputy civil law notary and co-founded several private commercial ventures and foundations for political studies.

He began his formal political career in September 2001 when he appeared 3rd on the list of the AVP. The 2001 elections did not go in favor of the AVP causing the party to lose 4 seats in the parliament. This led to the decision of the AVP leader, Tico Croes, to relinquish position. The leadership was handed over to the former minister of Justice, Pedro E. (Eddy) Croes. Mike Eman became the party's VP and the minority whip leader in parliament. subsequently Eman was elected party leader in 2003. After the 2009  elections, the AVP regained 2 seats, and Eman's part became thus the majority party in parliament.

Eman first cabinet was sworn in October 30, 2009, following his party's decisive victory in the 2013 election; his second cabinet was sworn in on 30 October 2013.

Following the 2017 general election Eman's party lost its majority in the Parliament of Aruba. Eman subsequently announced that he would resign as party leader and that he would not take a seat in the upcoming parliament.

Early life and career 
Eman was born in Oranjestad, Aruba and raised in Rancho, to Albert (Shon A) Eman, at the time leader of the AVP and his wife Blanche Eman-Harthogh. Mike became the youngest brother of Maria Albertina (Chuchu), Jan Hendrik Albert (Henny), Melva, Godlieb, Siegfried (Ven), Frederik Everhard (Braat), and Albert.

Eman is Jewish and plays an active role in the Jewish community and has worked to promote the presence of Chabad in Aruba. His mother was Jewish and his father was Protestant.

References

External links

 www.mikeeman.com (in Papiamento)

1961 births
Aruban Jews
Living people
Prime Ministers of Aruba
Jewish prime ministers
Aruban People's Party politicians
Members of the Estates of Aruba
People from Oranjestad, Aruba
Aruban businesspeople